

Events

February events
 February 28 – The Baltimore and Ohio Rail Road is incorporated.

May events
 May 5 – Mauch Chunk Switchback Railway opened by the Lehigh Coal & Navigation Company in the United States.

June events
 June 30 - the Saint-Étienne to Andrézieux Railway, the first railway line in France and continental Europe begins to operate.

September events
 September 7 – Opening of the first railway in Austria-Hungary, a horse-worked line from České Budějovice to Trojanov (in the present-day Czech Republic).

December events
 December 19 – The South Carolina Canal and Rail Road is chartered.

Unknown date events
 Claudius Crozet completes surveying a route for the first railroad to be built in Virginia, the Chesterfield Railroad.
 John B. Jervis becomes the chief engineer for the Delaware and Hudson Canal Company, the forerunner of the Delaware and Hudson Railroad.

Births

April births
 April 1 – Thomas Seavey Hall, American inventor of railroad signalling systems (d. 1880).

July births
 July 11 – Austin Corbin, president of Long Island Rail Road (d. 1896).

September births
 September 27 – Aaron Augustus Sargent, American journalist, lawyer and politician; authored the first Pacific Railroad Act (d. 1887).

October births
 October 27 – Albert Fink, German-born American civil engineer and railroad manager (d. 1897).

Deaths

References